Papke is a surname. Notable people with the surname include:

Billy Papke (1886–1936), American boxer 
Paweł Papke (born 1977), Polish volleyball player and politician
Ulrich Papke (born 1962), East German-German sprint canoeist